John Smith (born 12 January 1990) is a South African rower. He won a gold medal in the Men's lightweight coxless four event at the 2012 Summer Olympics, with teammates James Thompson, Matthew Brittain, and Sizwe Ndlovu.  In 2014, he won the men's lightweight double sculls with Thompson at the World Championships, setting a world's best time.  The pair also competed at the 2016 Summer Olympics.

He also won the World U-23 men's lightweight pair world championship with Lawrence Brittain in 2010, and competed in the men's four at the 2020 Summer Olympics.

References

External links
 

1990 births
Living people
South African male rowers
Olympic rowers of South Africa
Olympic gold medalists for South Africa
Olympic medalists in rowing
Rowers at the 2012 Summer Olympics
Rowers at the 2016 Summer Olympics
Sportspeople from Germiston
Medalists at the 2012 Summer Olympics
World Rowing Championships medalists for South Africa
South African people of British descent
Rowers at the 2020 Summer Olympics
21st-century South African people